Noemi Procopio is a forensic scientist and Research Senior Fellow based in Northumbria University, UK, originally from Sommariva del Bosco in Italy. Procopio is notable for her work in taphonomy and decomposition, in particular applying proteomics to the study of bone proteins in estimating age and time of death, including for submerged corpses. In 2019, Procopio was awarded a Future Leaders Fellowship by UK Research and Innovation, for her project Forens-OMICS: a cross disciplinary implementation of omics sciences to in vivo and post-mortem ageing investigations for forensic applications.

References

External links 

 Noemi  Procopio's homepage at Northumbria University

UK Research and Innovation Future Leaders Fellowship
Year of birth missing (living people)
Forensic scientists
Proteomics
Taphonomists
Academics of Northumbria University
Alumni of the University of Manchester
Living people